White Hands is a 1922 American Melodrama film directed by Lambert Hillyer that takes place in the United States. The film stars Hobart Bosworth, Robert McKim, and Freeman Wood.

Cast

 Hobart Bosworth as "Hurricane" Hardy
 Robert McKim as Leon Roche
 Freeman Wood as Ralph Alden
 Al Kaufman as "Grouch" Murphy
 Muriel Frances Dana as Peroxide
 Elinor Fair as Helen Maitland
 George O'Brien as Sailor

References

External links
 

1922 films
American black-and-white films
Silent American drama films
Melodrama films
Films directed by Lambert Hillyer
1920s American films
1920s English-language films